Samreen "Sam" Naz is a British television presenter, actress and screenwriter currently working as a news anchor for Sky News in London. She has previously hosted several news programmes including 60 Seconds. She wrote, produced and starred in a short film called Liberté (2021), in which she played the lead role of Noor Inayat Khan, a Muslim secret agent working for Britain's Special Operations Executive (SOE) during the Second World War.

Early life and education
Naz was born and brought up in Birmingham and is of Pakistani descent. Her parents moved from Pakistan in the 1970s. She studied Economics and Politics at the University of Leeds. In 2002, she received a bursary from the George Viner Memorial Fund, an initiative by the National Union of Journalists to broaden the diversity of journalists in the media.

Career
In 2010 she became the main presenter of BBC Three's 60 Seconds, anchoring the bulletins from Mondays to Thursdays. She also co-hosted BBC Three's live political discussion programme Free Speech. Naz joined the line-up at Sky News in 2016. She also chaired a special Media Summits event about Brexit in 2017, which featured Ed Vaizey.

Sam Naz has been a regular anchor of the overnight and early morning coverage on Sky News since 2016, typically being on air from midnight til 6am presenting Sky Midnight News and Sky World News. As of 2021, she has been one of the most frequent presenters of this slot.

Naz wrote, produced and starred in a short film called Liberté, in which she played the lead role of Noor Inayat Khan, a Muslim secret agent working for Britain's Special Operations Executive (SOE) during the Second World War. The film premiered in Los Angeles in September 2021 and was released internationally by Sky and The History Channel in February 2023. As of 2023, her production company, Laconic Raven, is developing a dramatic mini-series about the SOE.

Credits

Television

Film

References

External links
Sam Naz's BBC Three blog posts
Media Summits panel discussion on Brexit hosted by Sam Naz

British television newsreaders and news presenters
Sky News newsreaders and journalists
Alumni of the University of Leeds
Alumni of Leeds Trinity University
Living people
Year of birth missing (living people)
British people of Pakistani descent